Günter Christian Ludwig Neumann (19 May 1913 – 17 October 1972) was a German singer, composer lyricist, cabaretist and screenwriter. He contributed to many popular songs and worked frequently in the German film industry on productions such as The Berliner (1948).

Selected filmography
 M (uncredited) (1931)
 Bachelor's Paradise (1939)
 Heaven, We Inherit a Castle (1943)
 The Berliner (1948)
 Fireworks (1954)
 The Spessart Inn (1958)
 Aren't We Wonderful? (1958)
 The Beautiful Adventure (1959)
 The Haunted Castle (1960)
 Snow White and the Seven Jugglers (1962)
 Glorious Times at the Spessart Inn (1967)

References

Bibliography 
 Shandley, Robert. Rubble Films: German Cinema in the Shadow of the Third Reich. Temple University Press, 2010.

External links 
 

1913 births
1972 deaths
20th-century German male singers
Musicians from Berlin
20th-century German composers
Rundfunk im amerikanischen Sektor people